Lal-lo, officially the Municipality of Lal-Lo, is a 1st class municipality in the province of Cagayan, Philippines. According to the 2020 census, it has a population of 48,733 people.

During the Spanish colonial period, Lal-lo was known as Ciudad de Nueva Segovia and was the seat of the Diocese of Nueva Segovia before it was moved to Vigan in Ilocos Sur. It is currently under efforts to regain its Spanish-era city status.

Recently, the provincial government of Cagayan through the leadership of Governor Manuel Mamba is planning to make Lal-lo the provincial capital of Cagayan again.

An international airport was built in the southern part of Lal-lo. The Northern Cagayan International Airport is constructed to support the Cagayan Special Economic Zone in northern Cagayan and will also serve the seaborne traffic through Port Irene. The airport project involves the construction of a 2,200-meter runway, with a width of 45 meters, following the standards of the International Civil Aviation Organization. Once completed, the international airport can accommodate large aircraft such as the Airbus A319-100 and Boeing regional jets of comparable size. Royal Air Philippines do twice weekly service using BAe146 aircraft.

Etymology
Lal-lo means "twisting two strands to make a rope", or may also refer to the strong river current as it is located along Cagayan River, the longest and largest river in the Philippines.

In Fr. Jose Bugarin's Ibanag dictionary "Lallo-c, a town in this province which existed as the ancient capital until 1839 [also] Lallo-c, to twist two strands, making a string or rope."

History

Classical Era
In the classical era, Lal-lo was used to be the home of hunter-gatherers who were specialized in hunting mollusks. These hunter-gatherers have stockpiled their leftover mollusk shells in numerous sites in Lal-lo and neighboring Gattaran, until eventually, the shells formed into the largest stock of shell-midden sites in the entire Philippines.

Spanish Era
The first European to set foot on what is now the town of Lal-lo is Juan de Salcedo, the Spanish conquistador and grandson of Miguel Lopez de Legazpi, in 1572. Don Juan Pablo Carrion established it as a pueblo (municipality) in 1581 and named it Nueva Segovia. The reason is currently unknown, as the hometown of this Spanish soldier was Carrión de los Condes (Palencia, Spain), as his last name, Carrión, suggests. This is mentioned by Juan Miguel Aguilera and Ángel Miranda in their book Espadas del Fin del Mundo (2016). A founding population of 200 Spanish citizens from Europe accompanied by 100 Spanish soldiers set up settlements across Cagayan Valley, headed by the city of Nueva Segovia (Old Lal-lo). These people were in turn supplemented by 155 Latin American soldiers recruited from Mexico.

Diocese of Nueva Segovia

In 1595, Pope Clement VIII created the Diocese of Nueva Segovia and in 1596, the Dominicans accepted it as an ecclesiastical mission. Nueva Segovia had three churches: the cathedral that was under the secular clergy, and the parishes of Centro and Tocolona under the supervision of the Dominicans. But because of its distance from Manila and the constant threat of the Cagayan River's rampaging waters, the Diocese of Nueva Segovia was transferred to Vigan in Ilocos Sur province in 1758. The diocese's name went along with the transfer to Vigan and to avoid confusion, Bishop Miguel Garcia requested that Nueva Segovia and its suburbs renamed back to Lal-lo.  The seat of the Diocese of Nueva Segovia remains in Vigan till today where is now elevated as the Archdiocese of Nueva Segovia.

The transfer affected the closure of the cathedral and the merging of the three churches into the single parish of Centro. The two other churches were abandoned and eventually destroyed because of neglect while the church of Centro, dedicated to Santo Domingo de Guzman (Saint Dominic) became what is now the church of Lal-lo.  The remains of three bishops are interred in the church: Bishop Miguel de Benavides who was Nueva Segovia's first bishop and later of Manila where he founded the University of Santo Tomas, Bishop Diego de Soria who was the second bishop of the diocese, and Bishop Diego Aduarte who was the sixth.

Provincial capital
Lal-lo remained the capital of Cagayan province until 1839 when the provincial seat of power was relocated to Tuguegarao; and its transformation into the most important town in Cagayan led to the decline of Lal-lo. It was accepted as an ecclesiastical mission by the Dominicans in 1604, 23 years after the foundation of Lal-lo.

Restoration of Cityhood

The first attempt of the restoration of Lal-lo's city status was made during the first term of Mayor Florante Pascual. The historical document originally signed by King Philip was not found, even after sending a research delegation to Madrid. Pascual determined that the restoration of Lal-lo's cityhood be made through an earlier bill.

There was a move in the Philippine Congress to regain its cityhood as a component city, and also rename the municipality back to its original name, Nueva Segovia.

Renewed attempt of city status restoration was carried out in January 2012. Board member Maria Olivia Pascual said that researchers had found a Spanish document that declared the municipality as a city. According to her, a bill seeking the restoration of the city status of Lal-lo (the former Ciudad Nueva Segovia) might be filed again through the efforts of First District Representative Juan Ponce Enrile, Jr.

As recently as 2018, vice mayor Oliver Pascual has said that the establishment of Northern Cagayan International Airport in the municipality would be "a great boost" in its bid for the restoration of its city status.

Modern Era
In 2006, the shell-midden sites of Lal-lo and Gattaran were included in the UNESCO Tentative List for World Heritage Site inclusion, a step closer to becoming a world heritage site. The shell-midden sites are currently being conserved by the local government from looting to preserve its outstanding universal value.

Geography

Barangays
Lal-lo is politically subdivided into 35 barangays. These barangays are headed by elected officials: Barangay Captain, Barangay Council, whose members are called Barangay Councilors. All are elected every three years.

Climate

Demographics

Economy

Government
Lal-lo, belonging to the first legislative district of the province of Cagayan, is governed by a mayor designated as its local chief executive and by a municipal council as its legislative body in accordance with the Local Government Code. The mayor, vice mayor, and the councilors are elected directly by the people through an election which is being held every three years.

Elected officials

Education
The Schools Division of Cagayan governs the town's public education system. The division office is a field office of the DepEd in Cagayan Valley region. The office governs the public and private elementary and public and private high schools throughout the municipality.
 Lal-lo National High School
 Cagayan State University (Lal-lo Campus)
 Lyceum of Lal-lo
 Lal-lo National High School - Cabayabasan Annex
 Logac National High School
 Magapit National High School

Media
Lal-lo has one FM station DWRL 95.1 and two cable providers.

References

External links

[ Philippine Standard Geographic Code]
Philippine Census Information

Municipalities of Cagayan
Populated places on the Rio Grande de Cagayan
Former provincial capitals of the Philippines
Former cities in the Philippines
1581 establishments in the Philippines